A Town Called Paradise is the fifth studio album by Dutch DJ and record producer Tiësto, released on 13 June 2014 by Musical Freedom, PM:AM Recordings, and Universal Music. Five singles were released: "Pair of Dice", "Red Lights", "Wasted", "Let's Go" and "Light Years Away".

Singles
"Pair of Dice" was released as the first single from the album on 8 October 2012. The composed appears in the album in a vocal version which features Krewella.

"Red Lights" was released as the lead single from the album on 13 December 2013. It was his first number one in Scotland, and peaked at number 6 on the UK Singles Chart. The song reached the top 10 in Australia, Denmark, Norway and Sweden.

"Wasted" was released as the third single from the album on 25 April 2014. The song peaked at number 3 on the UK Singles Chart, and reached the top 10 in Sweden.

"Let's Go" was released as the fourth single from the album on 13 May 2014. The song was featured in the films Night at the Museum: Secret of the Tomb, Pitch Perfect 2, Vacation, Sisters, in the TV shows Red Band Society, Hawaii Five-0, and in the teaser trailer for the 2018 animated film Teen Titans Go! To the Movies.

"Light Years Away" was released as the album's fifth single on 28 November 2014. The song features English group DBX. According to group member Pete Kirtley, the song is about "not giving up, even though the path ahead sometimes seems impossible and unreachable".

Reception

Critical reception

Upon its release, A Town Called Paradise received mixed reviews from music critics. Christopher R. Weingarten of Rolling Stone gave the album a mixed review, stating, "EDM has changed pop, and now pop is changing veteran DJ Tiësto. He's moved from the abrasively chilly trance of 2009's Kaleidoscope to embrace pianos and guitars, a warm sound like the 4 a.m. version of Taylor Swift or Coldplay. He's a consummate crowd-pleaser, but he's best when he gets weird: The warped grind of "Echoes" is a standout; "Wasted" might be one of 2014's best country songs."

Commercial performance
On 19 June 2014, the album entered the Irish Albums Chart at number 22. The album entered the New Zealand Albums Chart at number 39. On 22 June 2014, the album debuted at number 22 on the UK Albums Chart. The album debuted at number 18 on the Billboard 200 chart and number 2 on the Billboard Dance/Electronic Albums chart. It opened in the United States with first week sales of 15,013.

Track listing

Notes
 signifies an additional producer.
 signifies a vocal producer.
 signifies an additional vocal producer.

Personnel

 Aaron Accetta – vocal engineer
 John Amatiello – additional production
 Ron Aniello – composer
 N. Audino – composer
 Zac Barnett – featured artist, vocals
 Hiten Bharadia – composer
 Gavin Bond – photography
 Dan Book – engineer, vocal producer, vocals
 Danny Boselovic – composer, piano
 Delbert Bowers – assistant
 Phillipa Brown – composer
 Christian Burns – composer, featured artist, vocals
 Simon Christianssen – engineer, mixing
 Sacha Collisson – composer, engineer, guitar, synthesizer
 Cruickshank – featured artist, vocals
 Josef Cruickshank – composer
 Christian Cummings – engineer
 Anna Luisa Daigneault – composer
 John Davis – mastering engineer
 Jonnie Davis "Most" – composer
 DBX – featured artist, producer
 Disco Fries – engineer, producer, programming
 Nicholas Ditri – composer, piano
 Tommy English – vocal engineer
 Carl Falk – composer, engineer, guitar, instrumentation, producer, programming, vocal arrangement
 Firebeatz – engineer, featured artist, mixing, primary artist, producer
 Simon Gain – composer
 Chris Galland – assistant
 Mike Gaydusek – vocal engineer
 Dean Gillard – additional production, instrumentation, mixing, programming, vocal mixing
 Shep Goodman – vocal engineer
 Charles Haddon – composer, engineer, Rhodes piano, vocals
 Paris Hampton – composer
 Hardwell (Robbert van de Corput) – engineer, featured artist, mixing, primary artist, producer, composer
 Stuart Hawkes – mastering engineer
 Patrick Heaney – engineer
 Wayne Hector – composer
 Caroline Hjeit – composer
 Oscar Holter – additional production, composer, drums, engineer, guitar, piano, producer
 Lewis Hughes – composer
 Icona Pop – featured artist, vocals
 Sjoerd Janssen – composer, mixing, producer, programming
 Wouter Janssen – composer, mixing, producer, programming
 Aino Jawo – composer
 KAAZE (Mick Kastenholt) – featured artist, primary artist, producer, composer, programming
 Anders Kallmark – composer, drums, engineer, piano
 Pete Kirtley – composer, engineer, piano, strings
 Karl-Ola S. Kjellholm – additional production, engineer, guitar
 Matthew Koma – bass, composer, engineer, featured artist, guitar, mixing, producer, programming, vocal engineer, vocal producer, vocals
 Krewella – featured artist, vocals
 Ladyhawke – featured artist, vocals
 Brandon Lowry – composer
 Jordan Loyd – photography
 Manny Marroquin – mixing
 Alexei Misoul – engineer, vocal producer, vocals
 Andreas Moe – composer, featured artist, vocals
 Matt Nash – composer, drums, engineer, guitar, piano, producer, synthesizer
 John James Newman – composer, vocals
 Ou Est le Swimming Pool – featured artist
 Ash Pournouri – composer
 Justin Prime – composer, producer
 Quilla – featured artist, vocals
 Eva Reistad – assistant engineer
 Alx Reuterskiöld – composer
 James Reynolds – mixing
 Ossama Al Sarraf – composer, guitar
 Markus Sepehrmanesh – composer
 Ned Shepard – composer, drums, engineer, featured artist, mixing, piano, producer
 Dave Silcox – composer, drums, engineer, producer, synthesizer
 Tim Smulders – composer
 Nick Steinhardt – design
 Sultan – drums, engineer, featured artist, mixing, producer
 Sultan + Ned Shepard – primary artist
 Tiësto (Tijs Verwest) – engineer, mixing, primary artist, producer, composer
 Kristopher Trindl – composer
 Twice as Nice – programming
 Jurre Van Doeselaar – composer
 Matt Ward – additional production, instrumentation, mixing, programming, vocal mixing
 Freddy Wexler – composer
 Måns Wredenberg – composer
 Rami Yacoub – composer, engineer, instrumentation, producer, programming, vocal arrangement, vocal editing
 Jahan Yousaf – composer
 Yasmine Yousaf – composer
 Michel Zitron – composer, vocals

Credits adapted from AllMusic.

Charts

Weekly charts

Year-end charts

Certifications

Release history

References

External links
 Tiesto.com
 A Town Called Paradise
 A Town Called Paradise lyrics

2014 albums
Tiësto albums